Stag night is the UK, Canadian, Irish, Australian and New Zealand term for a Bachelor party.

Stag Night is a 2008 American horror film written and directed by Peter A. Dowling and starring Kip Pardue, Vinessa Shaw, and Breckin Meyer. The plot follows four men from a bachelor party along with two strippers who become trapped in an abandoned platform in the New York City Subway, where they witness a murder.

Plot
Four men on a bachelor party in New York ride the subway and, along with two strippers from the club, accidentally get off at a station that closed down in the 1970s.  Trapped in the tunnels beneath New York, they witness the murder of a transit cop by three transients and find themselves on the run for their lives.

Cast
 Kip Pardue as Mike
 Vinessa Shaw as Brita
 Breckin Meyer as Tony
 Scott Adkins as Carl
 Karl Geary as Joe
 Sarah Barrand as Michele
 Rachel Oliva as Claire
 Luca Bercovici as Tunnel Rat #1
 Genadii Gancheva as Tunnel Rat #2
 Radoslav Parvanov as Tunnel Rat #3
 Suzanna Urszuly as Woman
 Itai Diakov as Kid Tunnel Rat
 Nikolai Sotirov as Old Man
 Phil Jackson as Rain Driver
 Vencislav Stojanov as Cop
 Jo Marr as Young Man
 Amy Mihailova	as Young Woman
 Yordan Zahariev as Bouncer #1
 Gabriel Balanica as Bouncer #2
 Maya Andreeva	as Old Woman
 Dennis Andreev as Child
 Lyubomir Yonchev as Shanty Town Bo

Production
Produced by Arnold Rifkin and Chris Eberts, under their Rifkin/Eberts label, and Michael Philip and Jo Marr of Film Tiger. The movie was shot in 2007 in Sofia, Bulgaria and in New York City. The post-production took place at "The Post Group", Hollywood, Los Angeles in 2008. Chris Ouwinga and Darryn Welch financed the film via their production company, Instinctive Film.

Starring Kip Pardue, Vinessa Shaw, Breckin Meyer, Karl Geary, Scott Adkins, Sarah Barrand, Rachel Oliva and Luca Bercovici.

Closing Credits Song, "Don't Hide Away From the Sun" by Alphanaut.

Inspiration
Running in almost real time, Stag Night is a throwback to the early film of John Carpenter and 1970s thrillers such as Deliverance while the plot bears a certain resemblance to that of the classic British horror film Death Line (1972).

Release
The film was first time released as Direct-to-DVD on 26 June 2008 in Brazil as Fuga Sobre Trilhos. It was part of the Screamfest Horror Film Festival on 8 February 2010. Ghost House Pictures released the DVD in the United States on 15 February 2011.

Notes

External links
 
 

2008 films
2008 horror films
2000s English-language films
2000s horror thriller films
Films shot in Bulgaria
American horror thriller films
Films shot in New York (state)
Films set in New York City
2000s American films